Kayseri station is the main station in Kayseri, Turkey.

The station was built in 1927. It is an important junction for those trains to East Anatolia.

References

Railway stations in Kayseri Province
Railway stations opened in 1927
Buildings and structures in Kayseri
First Turkish National architecture